Alcithoe smithi is a species of large sea snail, a marine gastropod mollusc in the family Volutidae, the volutes.

References

 Powell A W B, New Zealand Mollusca, William Collins Publishers Ltd, Auckland, New Zealand 1979 

Volutidae
Gastropods of New Zealand
Gastropods described in 1950
Taxa named by Arthur William Baden Powell
Endemic fauna of New Zealand
Endemic molluscs of New Zealand